is a 1989 Japanese comedy drama science fiction OVA written and directed by Mamoru Oshii and animated by Pierrot. A compilation film consisting of footage from the episodes entitled , also directed by Oshii, was released in 1990.

Plot
The story revolves around a small, normal family known as the Yomota family: A boy named Inumaru, his father Kinekuni and his mother Tamiko. One day, a beautiful girl with a yellow flower hat at their front door, calling herself "Maroko Yomota," granddaughter of Inumaru who travels back in time with a time machine to visit her ancestors. Despite Tamiko's strong refusal to acknowledge her as a Yomota, Kinekuni and Inumaru welcome her to stay with them, and the structure of a happy family has begun to collapse.

The episodes are told in the form of a play.

Cast and characters

A teenage boy who dreams of being with a beautiful girl. He immediately falls in love with Maroko when he meets her, despite her being his future granddaughter.

Inumaru's granddaughter from the future. The other Yomota's have a hard time accepting this, to the point where Tamiko leaves Inumaru and Kinekuni.

Inumaru's lazy father. He tends to get on his son's nerves with his lazy attitude.
 / 

Inumaru's grumpy mother. She always nags and is the first to object to believing that Mariko is from the future. She eventually decides to leave the household, as the news is too much for her to bear.
 / 

A man sent by the Agency of Time Administration to arrest Maroko for breaking one of the many laws of time travel. He is actually the son of Inumaru and Maroko.

A man that Tamiko teamed up with in order to find out more about Mariko and save the Yomota family from destruction.

The narrator who often talks about birds at the beginning of each episode.

Theme songs
Opening

August 5, 1989 - December 17, 1989
Lyricist: Yumi Kojima / Composer: Kenji Kawai / Arranger: Kenji Kawai / Singers: Yumi Kojima
Episodes: 1-5
Insert songs

November 10, 1989
Lyricist: Yumi Kojima / Composer: Kenji Kawai / Arranger: Kenji Kawai / Singers: Tesshō Genda
Episode: 4

December 17, 1989
Lyricist: Yumi Kojima / Composer: Kenji Kawai / Arranger: Kenji Kawai / Singers: Kōichi Yamadera, Machiko Washio
Episode: 5

January 25, 1990
Lyricist: Yumi Kojima / Composer: Kenji Kawai / Arranger: Kenji Kawai / Singers: Toshio Furukawa
Episode: 6

Episodes

Soundtrack

The  CD was released on August 21, 1993.

DVD releases

References

External links
 OVA series
 at Studio Pierrot (archive) 
 (anime OVA series)
 Film
Maroko film website at Studio Pierrot 

1989 anime OVAs
1990 anime films
1990 comedy-drama films
1990s science fiction horror films
1990 films
1993 soundtrack albums
Anime comedy films
Animated drama films
Compilation films
Films directed by Mamoru Oshii
Japanese comedy-drama films
Japanese animated science fiction films
Pierrot (company)
Comedy anime and manga
Drama anime and manga
Anime with original screenplays
Films scored by Kenji Kawai